The 2006–07 Kansas State Wildcats men's basketball team represented Kansas State University in the 2006–07 college basketball season. The team was led by first-year head coach Bob Huggins.  It was Huggins' only season at K-State, as he left the following season to coach at his alma mater, West Virginia Mountaineers.

The team concluded the year with a 23–12 (10–6) record, and reached the second round of the NIT tournament in the post-season.

Roster

Schedule

|-
!colspan=9| Regular season

|-
!colspan=9| Big 12 Regular Season

|-
!colspan=9| Phillips 66 2007 Big 12 Championship tournament

|-
!colspan=9|2007 NIT

Post-season

Big 12 tournament
The Wildcats went on to a 10–6 record in conference play, earning a number 4 seed in the 2007 Big 12 men's basketball tournament at the Sprint Center in Kansas City, Missouri.  The Wildcats faced the #5 seed Texas Tech Red Raiders and won 64-47.  They went on to lose in the next round to the #1 seed and eventual champion, Kansas Jayhawks, 67-61.

NIT tournament
The Wildcats earned a berth in the 2007 National Invitation Tournament as the #2 seed and host team in the West Region.  In the first round, Kansas State beat the #7 seed Vermont Catamounts, 59-57.  In the second round, the team lost to the #3 seed DePaul Blue Demons, 70-65.

References

Kansas State
Kansas State Wildcats men's basketball seasons
Kansas State
Kansas
Kansas